António Manuel 'Tomané' Nunes Ferreira (born 15 January 1987 in Nogueira do Cravo, Oliveira do Hospital) is a Portuguese retired footballer who played as a striker.

Club career
A product of Sporting Clube de Portugal's prolific youth system, Nunes made his first competitive appearance for the Lisbon club on 7 January 2006, playing 45 minutes in a 2–3 away loss against S.C. Braga in the Primeira Liga, and adding another match the following week in the domestic cup. He spent the following season with F.C. Barreirense of the third division, on loan.

In June 2007, Nunes was bought by La Liga side Villarreal CF, but spent the entire campaign with the Valencians' B-team in the third level, where he also failed to appear officially. He subsequently returned to his country, joining G.D. Tourizense in division three and scoring 13 goals in his first year, but only four in the following.

Nunes signed for C.F. Os Belenenses in the second tier in July 2011, after netting 16 times for Tourizense in his final season.

Personal life
Nunes' younger brother, Flávio, was also a footballer. A defender and midfielder, he also represented Tourizense, but spent most of his career with Académica de Coimbra and Málaga CF.

References

External links

1987 births
Living people
People from Oliveira do Hospital
Portuguese footballers
Association football forwards
Primeira Liga players
Liga Portugal 2 players
Segunda Divisão players
Sporting CP footballers
F.C. Barreirense players
G.D. Tourizense players
C.F. Os Belenenses players
S.C.U. Torreense players
Villarreal CF B players
Portugal youth international footballers
Portuguese expatriate footballers
Expatriate footballers in Spain
Sportspeople from Coimbra District